The 1932 Norwegian Football Cup was the 31st season of the Norwegian annual knockout football tournament. The tournament was open for all members of NFF, except those from Northern Norway. The final was played at Marienlyst Stadion in Drammen on 16 October 1932, and was contested by four-time former winners Ørn, and Fredrikstad who played their first final. Fredrikstad won the final 6–1, and secured their first title. Odd were the defending champions, but were eliminated by Torp in the fourth round.

Rounds and dates
 Qualifying round: 31 July
 First round: 7 August
 Second round: 14 August
 Third round: 28 August
 Fourth round: 4 September
 Quarter-finals: 18 September
 Semi-finals: 2 October
 Final: 16 October

Qualifying round

|-
|colspan="3" style="background-color:#97DEFF"|Replay

|}

First round

|-
|colspan="3" style="background-color:#97DEFF"|Replay

|}

Second round

|-
|colspan="3" style="background-color:#97DEFF"|Replay

|}

Third round 

|-
|colspan="3" style="background-color:#97DEFF"|Replay

|}

Fourth round

|}

Quarter-finals

|}

Semi-finals

|}

Final

See also
1932 in Norwegian football

References

Norwegian Football Cup seasons
Norway
Cup